Aleksandr Konstantinovich Krupskiy (born 4 January 1960) is a retired pole vaulter who represented the USSR and later Russia. He won the 1982 European Athletics Championships as well as three medals at the European Indoor Championships.

Achievements

External links 
 European Championships
 European Indoor Championships

1960 births
Living people
Soviet male pole vaulters
Russian male pole vaulters
European Athletics Championships medalists
Sportspeople from Irkutsk
Friendship Games medalists in athletics